Green Lantern: First Flight is a 2009 American animated superhero film based on the DC Comics Green Lantern mythology. Centering on the first mission of Hal Jordan (Christopher Meloni), the first human inducted into the Green Lantern Corps, the film was written by veteran DC Comics animation collaborator Alan Burnett, produced by Bruce Timm and directed by Lauren Montgomery. The fifth film of the DC Universe Animated Original Movies released by Warner Premiere and Warner Bros. Animation, the film was released on home media on July 28, 2009, and made its US broadcast premiere on Cartoon Network on January 16, 2010 at 8:00 p.m.

It was the last film to feature Malachi Throne and David Lander before their deaths on March 13, 2013 and December 4, 2020 respectively.

Plot
A long time ago, the Guardians of the Universe, the first race of sentient beings to ever exist, harnessed the power of the green element, the greatest power imaginable, to create the Green Lantern battery. However, the battery was vulnerable to the color yellow, the one part of the light spectrum that could resist green. The Guardians hid the most concentrated source of yellow energy, the yellow element, to prevent others from using it against them.

After the death of Abin Sur, several Green Lanterns arrive to take Ferris Aircraft's test pilot Hal Jordan (Christopher Meloni) to the Green Lantern Corps on Oa. He is placed under the supervision of respected senior officer Sinestro (Victor Garber), who is investigating Abin's murder. While undercover on the ship of Kanjar Ro (Kurtwood Smith) searching for the whereabouts of the stolen yellow element, Abin had come under attack. Fleeing to Earth, he had his ring find his successor and died of his injury shortly after. Unbeknownst to the other Green Lanterns, Sinestro had provided Kanjar with the location of the element in order to have it fashioned into a weapon of comparable power to the Green Lantern battery.

Jordan quickly comes to understand that Sinestro's beliefs are not in line with those of the Guardians: Sinestro believes that the Guardians have reduced the Corps to merely picking up the messes criminals create as opposed to proactively dealing with the problem. During a mission to capture Kanjar Ro, Jordan is knocked unconscious by Kanjar's energy staff. Sinestro comes in and kills Kanjar, pinning the blame on Jordan. As punishment, the Guardians strip Jordan of his ring.

While Jordan waits to be taken home, Sinestro uses his ring to temporarily animate Kanjar's corpse, allowing him to learn the location of Qward where the yellow element weapon is being fashioned. Jordan convinces fellow Lanterns Boodikka (Tricia Helfer) and Kilowog (Michael Madsen) that Sinestro is not what he seems. When they catch Sinestro enacting his plot, Boodikka reveals her true allegiance and incapacitates Kilowog, allowing Sinestro to escape. Jordan tricks her into destroying Kanjar's unstable energy staff, the explosion launching her into the tools hanging from the ceiling and killing her.

On Qward, the Weaponers bestow Sinestro with the yellow ring and battery, the latter of which resembles Ranx the Sentient City. Using its power, he lays waste to Oa, the yellow light easily overpowering the Green Lantern rings. The yellow battery destroys the green battery, rendering all the Green Lantern Corps' power rings inert and causing death by asphyxiation of countless Green Lanterns who were in space at the time of their rings' failure. Jordan, having recovered his ring moments too late, finds the battery and pounds on the inert green element. He places his ring on the small crack that appears, absorbing the whole of its power. Imbued with the full might of the green energy, he destroys the yellow battery by crushing it between two moons.

Having exhausted most of the green power to destroy the yellow battery, Jordan is left to fight against Sinestro under his own power. After an intense hand-to-hand battle without constructs, Jordan uses the last of his power to knock Sinestro to the surface of Oa where Kilowog crushes the yellow ring (as well as Sinestro's hand) with his foot. Having regained partial power to his ring earlier, Kilowog takes to the air and saves Jordan from a fatal fall to the planet's surface.

Once Oa is rebuilt and the Green Lantern battery restored, the Guardians give the privilege of leading the Corps in reciting the Green Lantern oath to Jordan. Jordan then leaves for Earth to check in with his other boss, Carol Ferris (Olivia d'Abo), remarking on the long "commute".

Cast
 Christopher Meloni as Hal Jordan / Green Lantern
 Victor Garber as Sinestro
 Tricia Helfer as Boodikka
 Michael Madsen as Kilowog
 John Larroquette as Tomar Re
 Kurtwood Smith as Kanjar Ro
 Larry Drake as Ganthet
 William Schallert as Appa Ali Apsa
 Malachi Throne as Ranakar
 Olivia d'Abo as Carol Ferris
 Richard Green as Cuch
 Juliet Landau as Labella
 David Lander as Ch'p
 Richard McGonagle as Abin Sur
 Rob Paulsen as Weaponers of Qward
 Kath Soucie as Arisia
 Jim Wise as Lieutenant
 Bruce Timm as Bug Boy

Production
According to director Montgomery, Jordan's origin story was previously covered in the Justice League: The New Frontier film: "...we really didn't want to spend a whole lot of time telling that same story over again. So in Green Lantern: First Flight, the origin story is over and done before the opening credits."

Soundtrack

Reception
Green Lantern: First Flight received mixed reviews from critics. ComingSoon.net gave a positive review, giving it a 7.5 out of 10, citing the impressive action sequences and praising the voice acting, remarking that "Green Lantern: First Flight is a fun action adventure that should please comic book fans." IGN praised the animation and the scale, but complained that the film glosses over a lot of Hal Jordan's backstory from the comics and lacks character development. "The filmmakers seem less interested in his transition from an ordinary man into a intergalactic superhero, and in their eagerness to get him up into space and fighting aliens right away." Overall they gave the film a 7 out of 10. Comic Book Resources gave a positive review for Green Lantern: First Flight, citing that "Green Lantern: First Flight is a welcome portrayal of the material. It shows the appropriate scale and scope of the concept. It illustrates the characters in their best light and, most crucially, makes you wish 'Green Lantern' was its own ongoing animated series." AMC's Filmcritic.com also gave a positive film review, giving the animated feature 4.0 out of 5 stars.

In a more negative review, Ryan Cracknell of Movie Views stated, "More interested in the villain than the hero, First Flight is a bland look at one of the sides of the DC universe that's normally much more interesting." James O'Ehley of Sci-Fi Movie Page wrote, "Clocking in at a mere 77 minutes, Green Lantern is action-packed right from the start, but the action comes at a price: not much effort is made to make Jordan an interesting or even likeable hero. In fact he is an excruciatingly one-dimensional character that is simply swept along from one action scene to the next."

The film earned $7,924,513 from domestic DVD sales and $1,911,052 from domestic Blu-ray sales, bringing its total domestic home video earnings to $9,835,565.

Home media
Green Lantern: First Flight was released on standard DVD in single and double disc editions, along with a high definition Blu-ray release, on July 28, 2009. Features outlined for the double disc edition in the press release include two production featurettes, commentary, a preview of Superman/Batman: Public Enemies, trailers of the DC Universe features, digital copy download, and the first two episodes of Justice League picked by Bruce Timm. The Blu-ray edition has all the features of the double disc standard definition release including three additional Justice League episodes selected by Bruce Timm and the only Duck Dodgers episode "The Green Loontern".

Related media
In the animated series Young Justice, in the episode "War" of its second season, exactly the same designs used in First Flight and in its subsequent film Green Lantern: Emerald Knights for the various alien races appearing, were also used in the first scenes of the episode, which involves one of the Green Lanterns from Earth, John Stewart.

References

External links

 
 Green Lantern: First Flight @ The World's Finest
 
 Green Lantern: First Flight DVD Trailer
 Interview with Victor Garber (Sinestro)
 Interview with Juliet Landau (Labella)
 Interview with writer Alan Burnett
 Interview with voice director Andrea Romano

Animated films based on DC Comics
Green Lantern films
DC Universe Animated Original Movies
2009 animated films
2009 direct-to-video films
2009 films
2000s American animated films
2000s animated superhero films
Films directed by Lauren Montgomery
Films set on fictional planets
Films with screenplays by Alan Burnett
Animated films about extraterrestrial life
American animated science fiction films
American animated action films
2000s English-language films